Po Chai Pills is a traditional Chinese medicine product made from several herbs formed into tiny spherical pills about 4 mm in diameter. It is used as a remedy for the relief of indigestion, heartburn, vomiting, diarrhea, and bloating. It can also be used as a hangover prevention remedy.

History
Po Chai Pills were developed by Li Shiu Kei in Foshan, Guangdong, in 1896. Following the Chinese Civil War, the Li family fled to Hong Kong and reestablished their company, Li Chung Shing Tong. However, their mainland property was nationalized. As a result, there are now two manufacturers of Po Chai Pills:

Li Chung Shing Tong (Holdings) Limited (李眾勝堂(集團)有限公司) in Hong Kong; and
Guangzhou Wanglaoji Pharmaceutical Company Limited (廣州王老吉葯業股份有限公司) in Guangzhou, China.

A mutual agreement between both parties has limited Wanglaoji's trademark rights to mainland China, while Li Chung Shing Tong has the rights to use the trademark in the rest of the world. The mainland manufacturer exports them from China as Curing Pills or Bao Ji Pills.

On 8 March 2010, sales of the pills and the capsule form of Po Chai from Li Chung Shing Tong were temporarily halted in Singapore as a precaution because traces of phenolphthalein and sibutramine were detected by the company in batches of the capsule form of Po Chai, and were recalled.
Phenolphthalein's past use for its laxative properties has been discontinued because of concerns it may be carcinogenic. On 24 March 2010, Hong Kong's Department of Health recalled both Po Chai Pills Capsule Form and Po Chai Pills Bottle Form from local retail outlets and consumers.

On 11 May 2010, a licensed manufacturer in proprietary Chinese medicine, Li Chung Shing Tong (Holdings) Ltd. HK was given the green light to resume production and marketing of Po Chai Pills Bottle Form. Laboratory tests identified 11 tainted samples, all in Capsule Form, while none of the Bottle Form samples was found to contain the above two western medicines. In connection, the manufacturer has withdrawn the application for registration of Po Chai Pills Capsule Form which ceased to be produced in late March 2010.

Ingredients
The lists of known ingredients for Po Chai pills are listed as follows:
The proprietary mixtures are shown on the right pictures: 

Polyporus (Fu-Ling) Sclerotium 
Southern Tsangshu (Cang-Zhu) Rhizome 
Patchouly (Huo-Xiang) herb 
Fragrant Angelica (Angelica anomala Lallem.) (Vai-Zhi) Root 
Kudzu (Ge-Gen) root 
Magnolia (Hou-Po) root bark 
Massa Fermentata (fermented mix of wheat flour, sweet annie aerial parts, cocklebur (xantium sibiricum part. Ex Widd.) aerial parts, and Smartweed (polygonum hydropiper L.) aerial parts (Shen-Chu) 
Job's Tears (Yi-yi Ren) Seed 
Germinated Rice (Orzya sativa L) (Gu-Ya) seed 
Field Mint (Menta halpocalyx Briq) (Bo-He) herb 
Chrysanthemum (Ju-Hua) flower 
Red Citrus (citrus grandis osbeck.) (Chu-Hung) Peel
Halloysitum I minera
Rhizoma Atrach root
Oryzae Satiae/sprout
Herba menthae leaves
Selerotrum Porifungal
Radix Puepariae root
Herba Agastaches S leaves
Excarpium Citri/tangerined red part
Cortex magnoliae O. bark
Masse Fermentata Neaven leaves

Endangered species
Some Po Chai pills contains Saussurea costus (Aucklandia, 木香), listed on the label as Radix Aucklandiae (Latin for "aucklandia root"), which is endangered in the wild and listed in CITES Appendix I.  As such, CITES permits or certificates are required for international trade in the product (including if the origin of the Saussurea costus was artificially propagated).

References

External links
 Po Chai Pills & Li Chung Shing Tong homepage
 www.scmp.com

Traditional Chinese medicine pills